The Holstein–Herring method, also called the surface Integral method, or Smirnov's method is an effective means of getting the exchange energy splittings of asymptotically degenerate energy states in molecular systems. Although the exchange energy becomes elusive at large internuclear systems, it is of prominent importance in theories of molecular binding and magnetism. This splitting results from the symmetry under exchange of identical nuclei (Pauli exclusion principle).

Theory
The basic idea pioneered by Holstein and Herring approach can be illustrated for the hydrogen molecular ion or more generally, atom-ion systems or one-active electron systems, as follows. We consider states that are represented by even or odd functions with respect to behavior under space inversion. This is denoted with the suffixes g and u from the German gerade and ungerade and are standard practice for the designation of electronic states of diatomic molecules, whereas for atomic states the terms even and odd are used.

The electronic time-independent Schrödinger equation can be written as:

where E is the (electronic) energy of a given quantum mechanical state (eigenstate), with the electronic state function  depending on the spatial coordinates of the electron and where  is the electron-nuclear Coulomb potential energy function. For the hydrogen molecular ion, this is:

For any gerade (or even) state, the electronic Schrödinger wave equation can be written in atomic units as:

For any ungerade (or odd) state, the corresponding wave equation can be written as:

For simplicity, we assume real functions (although the result can be generalized to the complex case). We then multiply the gerade wave equation by on the left and the ungerade wave equation on the left by and subtract to obtain:

where  is the exchange energy splitting.

also below). We denote  as the mid-plane located exactly between the two nuclei (see diagram for hydrogen molecular ion for more details), with  representing the unit normal vector of this plane (which is parallel to the Cartesian -direction), so that the full  space is divided into left and right halves. By considerations of symmetry:

This implies that:

Also, these localized functions are normalized, which leads to:

and conversely. Integration of the above in the whole space left to the mid-plane yields:

and 

 From a variation of the divergence theorem on the above, we finally obtain:

where  is a differential surface element of the mid-plane. This is the Holstein–Herring formula. From the latter, Conyers Herring was the first to show that the lead term for the asymptotic expansion of the energy difference between the two lowest states of the hydrogen molecular ion, namely the first excited state  and the ground state  (as expressed in molecular notation—see graph for energy curves), was found to be:

While it is true that for the Hydrogen molecular ion, the eigenenergies can be mathematically expressed in terms of a generalization of the Lambert W function, these asymptotic formulae are more useful in the long range and the Holstein–Herring method has a much wider range of applications than this particular molecule.

Applications
The Holstein–Herring formula had limited applications until around 1990 when Tang, Toennies, and Yiu demonstrated that  can be a polarized wave function, i.e. an atomic wave function localized at a particular nucleus but perturbed by the other nuclear center, and consequently without apparent gerade or ungerade symmetry, and nonetheless the Holstein–Herring formula above can be used to generate the correct asymptotic series expansions for the exchange energies. In this way, one has successfully recast a two-center formulation into an effective one-center formulation. Subsequently, it has been applied with success to one-active electron systems. Later, Scott et al. explained and clarified their results while sorting out subtle but important issues concerning the true convergence of the polarized wave function.

The outcome meant that it was possible to solve for the asymptotic exchange energy splittings to any order.

Physical interpretation
The Holstein–Herring formula can be physically interpreted as the electron undergoing "quantum tunnelling" between both nuclei, thus creating a current whose flux through the mid-plane allows us to isolate the exchange energy. The energy is thus shared, i.e. exchanged, between the two nuclear centers. Related to the tunnelling effect, a complementary interpretation from Sidney Coleman's Aspects of Symmetry (1985) has an "instanton" travelling near and about the classical paths within path integral formulation. Consequently this denominator is almost unity for sufficiently large internuclear distances  and only the surface integral of the numerator need be considered.

See also
 Dirac delta function model (1-D version of H2+)
 Exchange interaction
 Exchange symmetry
 Conyers Herring
 Hydrogen molecular ion
 Lambert W function
 Quantum tunneling
 List of quantum-mechanical systems with analytical solutions

References

Quantum chemistry